Please add names of notable painters with a Wikipedia page, in precise English alphabetical order, using U.S. spelling conventions. Country and regional names refer to where painters worked for long periods, not to personal allegiances.

Alejandro Obregón (1920–1992), Colombian painter, sculptor and engraver
Bencho Obreshkov (1899–1970), Bulgarian painter
Jacques-François Ochard (1800–1870), French artist and teacher
Jacob Ochtervelt (1634–1682), Dutch painter
Leonard Ochtman (1854–1935), American painter
Ogata Gekkō (尾形月耕, 1859–1920), Japanese painter and ukiyo-e woodblock print-maker
Ogata Kenzan (尾形乾山, 1663–1743), Japanese potter and painter
Ogata Kōrin (尾形光琳, 1658–1716), Japanese painter, lacquerer and designer
Juan O'Gorman (1905–1982), Mexican painter and architect
Yuki Ogura (1895–2000), Japanese nihonga painter
Dorothea Warren O'Hara (1873–1972), American ceramicist
Ohara Koson (小原古邨, 1877–1945), Japanese painter and print designer
Doug Ohlson (1936–2010), American artist
Michalis Oikonomou (1888–1933), Greek painter
Okada Beisanjin (岡田米山人, 1744–1820), Japanese painter and rice merchant
Okada Hanko (1782–1846)
Okamoto Tarō (1911–1996)
Georgia O'Keeffe (1887–1986), American artist
Aloysius O'Kelly (1853–1941)
Okuda Gensō (1912–2003)
Okumura Masanobu (1686–1764)
Okumura Togyu (1889–1990)
Jules Olitski (1922–2007), American abstract painter, printmaker, and sculptor
Viktor Oliva (1861–1928), Austro-Hungarian (Czech)/Czechoslovak painter and illustrator
Nathan Oliveira (1928–2010), American painter, printmaker, and sculptor
Ceferí Olivé (1907–1995), Catalan watercolor painter
Madge Oliver (1875–1924), English/French painter
Francisco Oller (1833–1917), Puerto Rican visual artist
Geoffrey Olsen (1943–2007), Welsh/American artist
Frank O'Meara (1853–1888), Irish painter
Kōshirō Onchi (恩地孝四郎, 1891–1955), Japanese print-maker
Julian Onderdonk (1882–1922), American painter
Tadashige Ono (小野忠重, 1909–1990), Japanese woodblock artist
Maria van Oosterwijk (1630–1693), Dutch painter
Bruce Onobrakpeya (born 1932), Nigerian print-maker, painter and sculptor
John Opie (1761–1807), English painter
Andrea Orcagna (1320–1368), Italian painter, sculptor and architect
William Quiller Orchardson (1835–1910), Scottish painter
Edward Otho Cresap Ord, II (1858–1923), American painter and poet
Bryan Organ (born 1935), English painter
Emil Orlik (1870–1932), Austrian painter, etcher and lithographer
Aleksander Orłowski (1777–1832), Polish painter, sketch maker and lithographer
István Orosz (born 1951), Hungarian painter, print-maker and animated film director
José Clemente Orozco (1883–1949), Mexican painter
Sir William Orpen (1878–1931), Irish painter
Manuel Ortiz de Zarate (1887–1946), Chilean painter
George Earl Ortman (1926–2015), American painter, print-maker and sculptor
Erik Ortvad (1917–2008), Danish painter
Walter Osborne (1859–1903), Irish painter
Adriaen van Ostade (1610–1685), Dutch painter
Isaac van Ostade (1621–1649), Dutch painter
Ilya Ostroukhov (1858–1929), Russian painter and art collector
Masamitsu Ōta (太田雅光, 1892–1975), Japanese print-maker
Otake Chikuha (尾竹竹坡, 1878–1936), Japanese painter
Johann Friedrich Overbeck (1789–1869), German painter
Amédée Ozenfant (1886–1966), French painter and writer
Auseklis Ozols (born 1941), American painter and teacher

References
References can be found under each entry.

O